Stephen Richard Kellogg (born November 28, 1976) is an American singer-songwriter and former leader of Stephen Kellogg and the Sixers.

Career

Kellogg founded his band Stephen Kellogg and the Sixers in 2003. The band went on hiatus in the fall of 2012. While Kellogg has consistently toured since then billed simply as “Stephen Kellogg," past members of the Sixers have joined him on stage from time to time.

In 2013, Kellogg gave a TEDx talk about job satisfaction.

On February 12, 2016, Kellogg released South, West, North, East, which Paste magazine called "a triumph" and Blurt magazine declared "a terrific new album." The premise of South, West, North, East was to record each section of the album in a different region of the USA, with different co-producers and different groups of musicians.

On March 23, 2018, Kellogg played at O.A.R.'s Concert for Dreams at The Beacon Theatre in New York City alongside O.A.R., Adam Duritz of Counting Crows, Nate Ruess of fun., Robert Randolph, Gavin Degraw, Matt Nathanson and more.

Stephen released Objects In The Mirror on November 23, 2018. Rolling Stone said Objects In The Mirror captures the talent, spontaneity, and humanity of Kellogg's songwriting... refreshingly free of pretense and studio polishing" and the sound was "...like John Prine fronting The Heartbreakers"

Charity Work 
Each year for the holiday season, Kellogg sells handwritten lyrics to raise money for St Jude's Children's Hospital and other charities. In 2015, Kellogg was part of the Bedstock lineup, the world’s first in-bed music festival, to raise awareness and funds for MyMusicRx, a program of the Children’s Cancer Association.

Performing for the Troops 
One of Kellogg’s passions has been visiting military bases to perform for the service men and women serving both domestically and overseas. When an opportunity came for him and his band to serve as “non-hard-core-right-wing, normal people that publicly supported the military,” they jumped on it. “None of us are socially conservative, but we have this big respect for the military. There is so much anti-war stuff going on and it feels weird to be fighting a war that people are complaining about. It’s important to question decisions but we wanted to say, the armed forces are not politics.” They toured with Armed Forces Entertainment in 2009 and 2010 to bring “home” to the troops in places like Kuwait, Israel, Bahrain and Ramstein Hospital in Germany. “Playing music and thanking them for their service was probably much more powerful for us,” says Kellogg. “They got a little diversion but it was life changing for us.”  In 2010, Stephen Kellogg & the Sixers were named the "Armed Forces Entertainer of the Year".

During the summer of 2014, Kellogg traveled to Africa and again, to the Middle East to play for troops.

Personal life 
Kellogg grew up in southern Connecticut and in 1997 began his musical career in Northampton, MA while interning for a local club. A few years later, he married his high school sweetheart and began a well-publicized affection for his role as husband and later, father to their four daughters.

Discography

Released with "The Sixers" 
 Bulletproof Heart - 2004
 Stephen Kellogg and the Sixers - 2005
 The First Waltz - 2006 - CD/DVD set
 Glassjaw Boxer - 2007
 The Bear - 2009
 Live from the Heart: 1000th Show, Irving Plaza, NYC - 2010
 Gift Horse - 2011

Stephen Kellogg solo releases 
 Invest in Us - 1994
 Rain Summer - The Stephen Kellogg Band - 1995
 Buffalo - Stephen Kellogg and the Root Cellar Band - 1997
 South of Stephen - 2000
 Muskrats, Mullets & Mesh Caps - 2001
 The Early Hits (1992-1997) - 2002
 Lucky 11 - 2002
 Blunderstone Rookery - 2013
 South West North East - 2016
Tour De Forty: Greatest Hits (So Far) Live - 2017
Objects in the Mirror - 2018

References

External links
 Official website
 https://twitter.com/Stephen_Kellogg
 https://www.facebook.com/sk6ers/?ref=bookmarks
 
 

1976 births
Living people
American country singer-songwriters
American country rock singers
Singer-songwriters from Massachusetts
American alternative country singers
American folk rock musicians
21st-century American singers
Country musicians from Massachusetts